Anolis darlingtoni, also known commonly as Darlington's anole and the La Hotte twig anole, is a species of lizard in the family Dactyloidae. The species is endemic to Haiti.

Etymology
The specific name, darlingtoni, is in honor of American entomologist Philip Jackson Darlington Jr.

Geographic range
A. darlingtoni is found in the Massif de la Hotte mountain range, Département du Sud, Haiti.

Habitat

Reproduction
A. darlingtoni is oviparous.

References

Further reading
Cochran DM (1935). "New reptiles and amphibians collected in Haiti by P.J. Darlington". Proceedings of the Boston Society of Natural History 40: 367–375. (Xiphocercus darlingtoni, new species, p. 373).
Schwartz A, Henderson RW (1991). Amphibians and Reptiles of the West Indies: Descriptions, Distributions, and Natural History. Gainesville: University of Florida Press. 720 pp. . (Anolis darlingtoni, p. 250).
Schwartz A, Thomas R (1975). A Check-list of West Indian Amphibians and Reptiles. Carnegie Museum of Natural History Special Publication No. 1. Pittsburgh, Pennsylvania: Carnegie Museum of Natural History. 216 pp. (Anolis darlingtoni, p. 77).

Anoles
Endemic fauna of Haiti
Reptiles of Haiti
Reptiles described in 1935
Taxa named by Doris Mable Cochran